Steve Kowit (June 30, 1938 – April 2, 2015) was an American poet, essayist, educator, and human-rights advocate.

He received multiple awards for his poetry.

Biography 
Kowit was born in Brooklyn, New York where as a young man he frequently gave poetry readings at coffee houses. After a stint in the Army Reserve, he earned his BA from Brooklyn College. He moved to San Francisco at the age of 27 spending time in the Haight-Ashbury district. Kowit earned a MA at San Francisco State College (now San Francisco State University when he was 30. After refusing Army induction at the beginning of the Vietnam War – or as Kowit called it, "America's genocidal slaughter of the Vietnamese people" – he traveled to Mexico, Central and South America with his wife, Mary. After the war Kowit returned to the States and resided in San Diego.

In San Diego he started teaching Poetry Writing in his Ocean Beach, San Diego home in the late 1970s.  He went on to teach classes at San Diego State University, University of California, San Diego and Southwestern College. His poetry workshops in public schools were acclaimed for "making writing fun."

Writing in the San Francisco Examiner, Sheila Farr wrote of Kowit's poetry:An easy charmer in his book The Dumbbell Nebula, Steve Kowit backs up the bantering narratives of a coffeehouse poet with drop-dead images and subtle control ... Kowit's work grows out of the Beat tradition, speaking obliquely and directly of its heroes ... Kowit doesn't get stuck there in self-satisfied beatdom, though, because he can't take himself seriously for long enough. He tickles heavy subjects into giggles of submission without making them look trivial or foolish. Kowit seems to enjoy toying with sound and rhythm, like a cat patting at a spider, and is partial to slant rhymes hidden in unruly cadences. He folds his content into soft mouthfuls of sound ... the poems grow more delicious in their crazy daring, epitomizing Kowit's own particular sidelong, silly way of approaching the truth.

Awards 
 National Endowment for the Arts Fellowship in Poetry
 Two Pushcart Prizes
 The Atlanta Review Paumanok Poetry Prize
 The Oroborus Book Award
 The San Diego Book Award
 The Tampa Review Poetry Prize
 Theodor Seuss Geisel Award in 2007 for The Gods of Rapture

Bibliography 

 Incitement to Nixonicide by Pablo Neruda, Steve Kowit (Translator) (French & European Publications, 2002)   
 The Maverick Poets: An Anthology by Steve Kowit (Editor), Kim Addonizio (Author) (Contributor), Wanda Coleman (Contributor), Billy Collins (Contributor) published 1988  
 In the Palm of Your Hand: A Poet's Portable Workshop: a Lively and Illuminating Guide for the Practicing Poet (Tilbury House, 1995) 
 The Dumbbell Nebula (1999)
 The First Noble Truth (2007)
 Cutting Our Losses (Contact II Publications, 1982)
 Lurid Confessions (Carpenter Press, 1983)
 The Gods of Rapture: Poems in the Erotic Mood (San Diego City Works Press, 2006)
 Heart in utter confusion: Takes on the erotic poetry of India (1982) with Alan Horseradish (Illustrator) 
 Passionate Journey: Poems and Drawings in the Erotic Mood (City Miner Books, 1984) with Arthur Okamura
 Mysteries of the Body: Poems by Steve Kowit (Uroboros Books, 1994)
 Epic Journeys, Unbelievable Distances (1998)
 Cherish: New and Selected Poems (University of Tampa Press, 2015)

References

External links 
 Tributes to Steve Kowit, San Diego Reader
  Steve Kowit Official Website

1938 births
2015 deaths
American male poets
American people of Jewish descent
Poets from New York (state)
Writers from Brooklyn
Brooklyn College alumni
San Francisco State University alumni